Gil Vainshtein (born 29 October 1984 in Ukraine) is a Canadian association football player who plays as a midfielder for the Italia Shooters of the Canadian Soccer League. In university he played for Alderson-Broaddus College, with whom he was named to the 2005 NSCAA/Adidas NCAA Division II All-Appalachian Region second team, and named 2005 First Team All-West Virginia Intercollegiate Athletic Conference (WVIAC). Professionally, he has played for the North York Astros and the Italia Shooters. Vainshtein played for and was team captain of the Canadian football squad that competed at the 2009 Maccabiah Games in Israel, and won a bronze medal, and also played for Team Canada in the 2013 Maccabiah Games, winning a second bronze medal.

Biography

Playing career 
Vainshtein is a midfielder in association football. He attended Alderson-Broaddus College in West Virginia, playing for its soccer team the Battlers, and graduating in 2007. In his junior year, Vainshtein was named by the National Soccer Coaches Association of America to the 2005 NSCAA/Adidas NCAA Division II All-Appalachian Region second team. He was also named 2005 First Team All-West Virginia Intercollegiate Athletic Conference (WVIAC). 

In 2007, he played for the North York Astros in Canada. In 2008 Vainshtein played for the Italia Shooters in Canada.

In 2009, Vainshtein played for and was team captain of the Canadian football squad that competed at the 2009 Maccabiah Games in Israel, and won a bronze medal.  He also played for Team Canada in the 2013 Maccabiah Games, winning a second bronze medal.

Statistics

References 

1984 births
Living people
Alderson Broaddus Battlers men's soccer players
Association football defenders
Association football midfielders
Canadian soccer players
Canadian people of Israeli descent
Canadian people of Ukrainian-Jewish descent
Canadian Soccer League (1998–present) players
Competitors at the 2009 Maccabiah Games
Competitors at the 2013 Maccabiah Games
Jewish Canadian sportspeople
North York Astros players
Maccabiah Games bronze medalists for Canada
Maccabiah Games medalists in football
Ukrainian emigrants to Canada
Ukrainian Jews
York Region Shooters players